Available Jones may refer to: 
 Available Jones, a character in the comic strip Li'l Abner
 Sheldon Jones or Available Jones (1922–1991), American baseball player